Al-Mashana is a sub-district located in Al Mashannah District, Ibb Governorate, Yemen. Al-Mashana  had a population of  86212 as of 2004.

References 

Sub-districts in Al Mashannah District